Warnery was a type foundry.

Typefaces
These foundry types were produced by the Warnery type foundry:
 Mozart Noir
 Daiphane, an in-line version of Mozart Noir.

References

External links
Fonts in Use-Warnery

1857 establishments in France
French typographers and type designers
Letterpress font foundries